Innocents is a British television medical drama film, written by Neil McKay and directed by Peter Kosminsky, first broadcast on Channel 4 on 1 October 2000 as part of Channel 4's Doctors on Trial season. The film, based upon the Bristol heart scandal of the 1980s and 90s, stars Tim Pigott-Smith as James Wisheart and Madhav Sharma as Janarda Dhasmana, who whilst working together to perform 33 arterial-switch operations, drew up a mortality rate of 66% among patients under a month old, and 43% among those over a month old. Aden Gillett co-stars as Steve Bolsin, the whistleblower whose testimony first brought the scandal to public attention.

The film broadcast in the United States as part of PBS' Masterpiece Theatre strand on 6 May 2002. The New York Times review of the film commented that "Neil McKay's script captures the intelligent persuasiveness of the surgeons and the twisted rationales employed by fairly good people doing bad things. Obviously there is no shortage of human drama in this story, and the scenes of parents reacting to news about their babies are almost painfully real. Eventually the confused drama within the infirmary becomes gripping, too." The film was nominated for an international Emmy Award in 2001.

Cast
 Tim Pigott-Smith as James Wisheart
 Madhav Sharma as Janardan Dhasmana
 Aden Gillett as Steve Bolsin
 Emma Cunniffe as Sharon Peacock
 Andy Snowden as Daryl Peacock
 Kate Redshaw as Julie Johnson
 Adie Allen as Helen Rickard
 Gillian Bevan as Alison Hayes
 Roger Brierley as Dr. John Roylance
 Silas Carson as Ash Pawade
 Oliver Cotton as Mike Angelini
 Jonathan Cullen as Dr. Rob Martin
 Glyn Grimstead as Trevor Jones
 Joanne Howarth as Rosemary Jones
 Allin Kempthorne as Paul Bradley
 Dawn McDaniel as Kay Armstrong
 Darren Morfitt as William Booth
 Pooky Quesnel as Michaela Willis
 Darren Strange as Steve Johnson

References

External links

2000 television films
2000 films
British crime drama films
Channel 4 television films
Channel 4 television dramas
Television series by ITV Studios
Films shot in Bristol
2000s English-language films
2000s British films
British drama television films